Andrew Richard Welch FRSA (born 5 February 1949) is a prominent British theatre producer.

Welch was educated at Bedford School and at Swansea University. Between 1998 and 2002 he was Artistic Director of the Chichester Festival and the Chichester Festival Theatre. He has been described by The Daily Telegraph as the "unsung hero of British theatre".

References

1949 births
People educated at Bedford School
Alumni of Swansea University
British theatre managers and producers
English theatre managers and producers
Living people